"Astral Weeks"  is the title song and opening track on the 1968 album Astral Weeks by Northern Irish singer-songwriter Van Morrison.

Recording
On the first recording session for the album on 25 September 1968, this song was the last of four recorded for that date.  John Payne, the flautist who had been working with Morrison, said it was the first time he had ever heard it, and that although the song may sound rehearsed it was actually captured from the only take.

Composition
Morrison described the song "Astral Weeks" as being: "like transforming energy, or going from one source to another with it being born again like a rebirth.  I remember reading about you having to die  to be born.  It's one of those songs where you can see the light at the end of the tunnel and that's basically what the song says." Morrison told Steve Turner that he was working on the song back in Belfast in 1966 when he visited painter Cecil McCartney who had drawings on astral projection "and that's why I called it "Astral Weeks".

Brian Hinton's review of the song states: "All is uncertain, this spiritual rebirth a question still, not a statement, and Van equates his move to a new world — both America and that of love— with a sense of being lost, "ain't nothing but a stranger in this world".

Acclaim
The song "Astral Weeks" was rated #475 on the WXPN All Time Greatest Songs in 2004 and No. 875 on the list of 885 Essential Songs voted on by listeners of WXPN in 2008.

Appearance on other albums
"Astral Weeks" was featured on Morrison's album Astral Weeks Live at the Hollywood Bowl, released in 2009 to celebrate forty years since Astral Weeks was first released.

Personnel
Van Morrison – vocals, acoustic guitar
Jay Berliner – classical guitar
Richard Davis – double bass
John Payne – flute
Warren Smith, Jr. – percussion, vibraphone
Larry Fallon – string arrangements

Covers
The song "Astral Weeks" has been covered by Glen Hansard of The Frames, Brian Houston, and The Secret Machines on their EP The Road Leads Where It's Led.

Notes

References
Heylin, Clinton (2003). Can You Feel the Silence? Van Morrison: A New Biography, Chicago Review Press, 
Hinton, Brian (1997). Celtic Crossroads: The Art of Van Morrison, Sanctuary, 
Turner, Steve (1993). Van Morrison: Too Late to Stop Now, Viking Penguin, 

1968 songs
British folk rock songs
Van Morrison songs
Songs written by Van Morrison
Song recordings produced by Lewis Merenstein